Catharina Geertruida Santing (born 1958), commonly going by Catrien Santing is a Dutch medievalist. Her research focuses on cultural history and medical history in the late-medieval and early-modern Low Countries.

Career
Santing studied History and Art History at the University of Groningen, and worked as a lecturer in the same institution. She obtained her doctorate in 1992 with a thesis on the Renaissance physician Theodericus Ulsenius. She has since 2009 been full professor of Medieval History in Groningen. She has also served as chair of the editorial board of BMGN: Low Countries Historical Review.

Publications
Catrien Santing (ed.), De geschiedenis van de Middeleeuwen aan de Groningse universiteit 1614-1939 (Hilversum, 1997)
Frank Huisman, Catrien Santing (eds.), Medische geschiedenis in regionaal perspectief: Groningen 1500-1900 (Rotterdam: Erasmus 1997)
Catrien Santing, Henk te Velde, Margrith Wilke (eds.), Machtige lichamen. Het vingertje van Luns en andere politieke wapens (Amsterdam, 2005)
Maarten Duijvendak, Hidde Feenstra, Martin Hillenga, Catrien Santing (eds.), Geschiedenis van Groningen, 3 vols. (Zwolle: Waanders, 2008)
Hans Cools, Catrien Santing, Hans de Valk (eds.), Adrian VI: A Dutch Pope in a Roman Context (Turnhout: Brepols, 2012)
C. G. Santing & J. J. Touber (eds.), Blood – Symbol – Liquid (Groningen Studies in Cultural Change; Leuven: Peeters, 2012). 
Catrien Santing, Barbara Baert & Anita Traninger (eds.), Disembodied Heads in Medieval and Early Modern Culture (Leiden: Brill Publishers, 2013)

References

External links
 Staff page at the University of Groningen website. Accessed 15 March 2015.

1958 births
Living people
Dutch art historians
Dutch women historians
Dutch medievalists
Women medievalists
Dutch medical historians
University of Groningen alumni
Academic staff of the University of Groningen
People from Meppel
Women art historians
20th-century Dutch women writers
20th-century Dutch historians
21st-century Dutch women writers
21st-century Dutch historians